Thabiso is a given name. Notable people with the name include:

Thabiso Baholo (born 1990), Basotho swimmer
Thabiso Brown (born 1995), Mosotho footballer
Thabiso Khumalo (born 1980), former South African footballer
Thabiso Kutumela (born 1993), South African soccer player
Thabiso Maile (born 1987), Mosotho footballer
Thabiso Maretlwaneng, Botswanan television and film producer
Thabiso Mchunu (born 1988), South African professional boxer
Thabiso Benedict Moeng (born 1983), South African long-distance runner
Thabiso Mokhosi (1968–2019), South African Army officer, briefly Chief of the South African Army
Thabiso Moqhali (born 1967), retired marathon runner from Lesotho
Emanuel Thabiso Nketu (born 1980), amateur Olympic bantamweight boxer from Lesotho
Thabiso Nkoana (born 1992), South African footballer
Thabiso Relekhetla (born 1960), Lesotho long-distance runner
Thabiso Sekgala (1981–2014), South African photographer